John Leslie Chadwick (11 May 1943 – 26 December 2019), was an English bassist, who was a founding member of Gerry and the Pacemakers.

Early Life 
Chadwick was born in Aigburth, Liverpool, Lancashire (now Merseyside), England.

Gerry and the Pacemakers

Early Years (1961-1963) 
Chadwick joined Gerry and the Pacemakers in 1961. He originally did not own a bass guitar and played a standard Fender Stratocaster with the bass setting exaggerated until obtaining a proper bass. He eventually acquired a sunburst Epiphone Rivoli bass which he used for most of his performances with the Pacemakers.

On 19 October 1961, the Beatles and Gerry and the Pacemakers merged to become the 'Beatmakers', for a one-off performance in Litherland Town Hall. The line-up comprised Gerry Marsden, George Harrison, Paul McCartney, John Lennon, Les Maguire, Pete Best, Freddy Marsden, plus vocalist Karl Terry from the Cruisers with Chadwick on bass guitar.

International Success (1963-1966) 
The Pacemakers signed to EMI Records In 1963, and were managed by Brian Epstein. They achieved immediate success in the British chart and later in the United States. They were the first group to hit number one in the British charts with their first five singles, starting with How Do You Do It?.

The band would go on to have many more hits including: I Like It, You'll Never Walk Alone, Ferry Cross The Mersey, and I'm the One, among many others.

The Pacemakers appeared in the 1964 filmed event T.A.M.I. Show, and starred in a film of their own, titled Ferry Cross the Mersey.

By late 1965, the Pacemakers were declining in popularity, and soon after, split up in 1966.

Later life and death 
When the Pacemakers split up in 1966, he bought a garage with fellow former Pacemaker, Les Maguire. In 1973, Chadwick moved to Sydney, Australia, where he set up an employment agency.

He died in Sydney on 26 December 2019, from brain cancer, aged 76.

Discography

Studio Albums 

 How Do You Like It? (1963)
 Don’t Let The Sun Catch You Crying (1964)
 Gerry and the Pacemakers' Second Album (1964)
 Gerry’s Second Album (1965)
 I’ll Be There (1965)
 Girl On A Swing (1966)
 Gerry and the Pacemakers... Today! (1967)

Singles

Filmography 

 T.A.M.I Show (1964)
 Ferry Cross The Mersey (1965)

References

1943 births
2019 deaths
Deaths from brain cancer in Australia
English expatriates in Australia
English rock bass guitarists
Male bass guitarists
Musicians from Liverpool
Beat musicians